Filio was a Hansa A Type cargo ship which was built as Njong in 1944 by Stettiner Vulkan Werft AG, Stettin, Germany for Deutsche Afrika-Linien, Hamburg Germany. She was seized as a prize of war in 1945, passing to the Ministry of War Transport and renamed Empire Garland. She was sold in 1946 and was renamed Sheldrake. She was sold to Liberia in 1959 and renamed Salamstar. Sold to Greece in 1960 and renamed Ambelos. She was sold in 1961 and renamed Marmina. A final sale in 1968 saw her renamed Filio. She served until 1972, when she was scrapped.

Description

The engine was built by Stettiner Vulkan Werft AG.

History
Njong was a Hansa A Type cargo ship built in 1944 as yard number 28 by Stettiner Vulkan Werft AG, Stettin, Germany for Deutsche Afrika-Linien, Hamburg, Germany. She was launched in January 1944 and completed in December. Her port of registry was Hamburg.

In May 1945, Njong was seized as a prize of war at Flensburg. The Code Letters GJLT and United Kingdom Official Number 180609 were allocated. Her port of registry was London and she was operated under the management of the Dundee, Perth & London Shipping Co. Ltd.

In 1947, Empire Garland was sold to the General Steam Navigation Co. Ltd. and was renamed Sheldrake. In May 1958, a wages dispute amongst the crew whilst she was at Montreal, Canada meant that a new crew had to be flown out. Eighteen crewmen were charged with refusing to sail.

In 1958, Sheldrake was sold to Johal Navigation Ltd, Monrovia, Liberia and was renamed Salamstar. She was sold in 1961 to Johal Navigation Ltd, Piraeus, Greece and renamed Ambelos. She was sold later that year to N J Goumas, Piraeus and was renamed Marmina. She was sold to Constantine Raikos & Filiou Raikou, Piraeus in 1968 and renamed Filio. She arrived at Aspropyrgos, Greece on 15 June 1972 for scrapping by N Tzonis.

References

1944 ships
Ships built in Hamburg
World War II merchant ships of Germany
Steamships of Germany
Empire ships
Ministry of War Transport ships
Merchant ships of the United Kingdom
Steamships of the United Kingdom
Ships of the British India Steam Navigation Company
Merchant ships of Liberia
Steamships of Liberia
Merchant ships of Greece
Steamships of Greece